Allen Feldman is an anthropologist and professor. He is Professor of Media, Culture, and Communication at the New York University (NYU) Steinhardt School of Culture, Education, and Human Development. He has taught at Central European University in Budapest, the Institute of Humanities Studies in Ljubljana, Slovenia, and in the Department of Performance Studies at NYU. He received a Ph.D. in cultural anthropology at New School for Social Research, where he also received his M.A. and B.A.

His research and teaching interests include visual culture and violence, the political anthropology of the human body and the senses, performance studies, state cultures, and the political archaeology of media and technology.

His first book, Formations of Violence: The Narrative of the Body and Political Terror in Northern Ireland, was published by the University of Chicago Press in 1991. It is a treatment of the relationship between the objectives of violent politics in Northern Ireland and their application in the methods of real violence as a vehicle for sustaining an ideological content despite its success in achieving political goals. He has been working on a project exploring the relationship between "the mediazation of the war" and the "militization of the media". In May 2003, Feldman organized a conference on the subject, the Future of War: Aesthetics, Politics, Technologies in association with the New School and the Lower Manhattan Cultural Council He is editing a collection of essays based on the work of the conference. He is also working on a write-up of his ethnographic fieldwork in the South African Truth and Reconciliation Commission, for which he was awarded a Senior Guggenheim fellowship.

External links
 Faculty bio at NYU
 Faculty profile at NYU

Notes

American anthropologists
Living people
Steinhardt School of Culture, Education, and Human Development faculty
Academic staff of Central European University
The New School alumni
Year of birth missing (living people)